The canton of Marches du Sud-Quercy is an administrative division of the Lot department, southern France. It was created at the French canton reorganisation which came into effect in March 2015. Its seat is in Castelnau-Montratier-Sainte-Alauzie.

It consists of the following communes:
 
Aujols
Bach
Beauregard
Belfort-du-Quercy
Belmont-Sainte-Foi
Castelnau-Montratier-Sainte-Alauzie
Cézac
Concots
Cremps
Escamps
Fontanes
Laburgade
Lalbenque
Laramière
Lhospitalet
Limogne-en-Quercy
Lugagnac
Montdoumerc
Pern
Promilhanes
Saillac
Saint-Paul-Flaugnac
Varaire
Vaylats
Vidaillac

References

Cantons of Lot (department)